Icius is a genus of jumping spiders described by Eugène Simon in 1876, belonging to the Order Araneae, Family Salticidae.

Distribution
Icius is an almost cosmopolitan genus, widespread in Europe (mainly in Belgium, Croatia, France, Germany, Italy, Greece, Poland, Romania, Portugal, southern Russia, Slovenia, Switzerland, Spain and in The Netherlands), as well in Asia, Africa and in Central and South America (one species, Icius pallidulus is endemic of Micronesia).

Species
As of November 2021, the World Spider Catalog lists the following species in the genus:
 Icius abnormis Denis, 1958 – Afghanistan
Icius alboterminus (Caleb, 2014) – India, Nepal
Icius bamboo Cao & Li, 2016 – China
Icius bilobus Yang & Tang, 1996 – China
 Icius brunellii Caporiacco, 1940 – Ethiopia
 Icius cervinus Simon, 1878 – Russia
 Icius congener Simon, 1871 – Western Mediterranean
 Icius crassipes Simon, 1868 – Spain, Algeria, Tunisia
 Icius dendryphantoides Strand, 1909 – South Africa
 Icius desertorum Simon, 1901 – South Africa
Icius fagei (Lessert, 1925) – Tanzania
 Icius glaucochirus (Thorell, 1890) – Sumatra
Icius grassei (Berland & Millot, 1941) – Malawi, Nigeria, DR Congo, Kenya
 Icius hamatus (C. L. Koch, 1846) – Palearctic
Icius ildefonsus Chamberlin, 1924 – Mexico
 Icius ildefonsus Chamberlin, 1924 – Mexico
 Icius inhonestus Keyserling, 1878 – Uruguay
 Icius insolidus (Wesołowska, 1999) – Nigeria, southern Africa
Icius insolitus Alicata & Cantarella, 1994 – Algeria
Icius kumariae Caleb, 2017 – India
 Icius lamellatus Wunderlich, 2011 – Portugal, Italy
 Icius mbitaensis Wesołowska, 2011 – Kenya
Icius minimus Wesołowska & Tomasiewicz, 2008 – Ethiopia
Icius niger Peelle & Saito, 1933 – Kuril Islands
 Icius nigricaudus Wesołowska & Haddad, 2009 – South Africa
 Icius ocellatus Pavesi, 1883 – East Africa
 Icius olokomei Wesołowska & A. Russell-Smith, 2011 – Nigeria
 Icius pallidulus Nakatsudi, 1943 – Micronesia
 Icius peculiaris Wesołowska & Tomasiewicz, 2008 – Ethiopia
 Icius pulchellus Haddad & Wesołowska, 2011 – South Africa
 Icius separatus Banks, 1903 – Hispaniola
 Icius simoni Alicata & Cantarella, 1994 – Algeria
 Icius steeleae Logunov, 2004 – Sudan, Kenya, Uganda
 Icius subinermis Simon, 1937 – Mediterranean, Germany, Hungary, Romania. Introduced to USA
 Icius testaceolineatus (Lucas, 1846) – Algeria
Icius tukarami Prajapati, Kumbhar, Caleb, Sanap & Kamboj, 2021 – India
Icius vikrambatrai Prajapati, Malamel, Sudhikumar & Sebastian, 2018 – India
 Icius yadongensis Hu, 2001 – China

References

 Simon, 1876 - Les arachnides de France, Paris, vol.3, p. 1-364

External links

Photograph of I. hamatus
Photographs of I. hamatus and I. subinermis
 Fauna Europaea
 Biolib

Salticidae
Salticidae genera
Taxa named by Eugène Simon
Cosmopolitan spiders